Sir Alexander Cornewall Duff-Gordon, 3rd Baronet (3 February 1811 – 27 October 1872) was a British civil servant and Baronet of Halkin.  He was the husband of Lucie, Lady Duff-Gordon, a translator and writer best known for her correspondence on Egypt.

Early life

Duff-Gordon was born 3 February 1811 the eldest son of Sir William Duff-Gordon, a younger son of the House of Aberdeen and his mother, Caroline, who was a daughter of Sir George Cornewall. He succeeded to his father's title on 8 March 1823.

Marriage
At a society ball at Lansdowne House, the London home of the Marquess of Lansdowne in 1838 he meet Lucie Austin who was ten years his junior. Lucie was the daughter of literary translator Sarah Austin and legal philosopher John Austin. The couple married despite the initial objections of his mother over Lucie's lack of a dowry) on 16 May 1840 in Kensington Old Church.

Following their marriage, the couple resided at 8 Queen Square, Westminster, a house with a statue of Queen Anne at one end, since renumbered as 15 Queen Anne's Gate.  Here a remarkable circle of friends and acquaintances frequently met: Lord Lansdowne, Lord Monteagle, Caroline Norton, Dickens, Thackeray, Elliot Warburton, Tom Taylor, Tennyson, Alexander Kinglake, and Henry Taylor were habitués. 

Every foreigner of talent and renown looked upon the house as a centre of interest. On one occasion Leopold von Ranke was among the visitors. 
Following the birth of their son, Maurice, in 1849, Lady Duff-Gordon began to succumb to tuberculosis and by the winter of 1861 she had become so ill that her doctors advised her to travel to a warmer, drier climate. 

After trying Ventnor for two winters, left her husband and children behind in England and went on a voyage to the Cape of Good Hope in 1860.
Upon her return to England she was persuaded to go to Eaux Bonnes in the autumn of 1862, which reportedly did harm her health.

Lady Duff-Gordon then decided to visit the newly fashionable Egypt, leaving her husband and children behind in England. She reached Alexandria in October 1862 and, except for two short visits to England in 1863 and 1865, she remained there for the sake of her health and separated from her husband until her death in 1869.

Career
Duff-Gordon was for many years a clerk in the Treasury, and acted as private secretary to at least one Chancellor of the Exchequer. He became a senior clerk in the Treasury in 1854, and a Commissioner of Inland Revenue in 1856; he was also Assistant Gentleman Usher of the Privy Chamber to Her Majesty.

Death
He died 27 October 1872, his will was probated 6 November, and was valued at less than £15,000.

Sir Alexander's gravestone is in the churchyard of St Dunstan's Church, Cheam, Surrey.  It records "his beloved wife Lucie, only daughter of John and Sarah Austin, who died and was buried in Egypt." There is also an inscription regarding Sir Alexander and Lucie's youngest child, Urania, who was born in November 1858(?) and died 22 September 1877.  The inscription is in some places very difficult to read.

Personal life
He and his wife had four children. Their daughter Janet Ann Ross was born in 1842 and died in 1927. Their second child was born in 1849 but died after only a few months of life. Their third child and only son Maurice (1849–1896) became Sir Maurice Duff-Gordon, and succeeded to his father's title becoming the 4th Baronet. Their fourth child Urania was born in 1858 and died on 22 September 1877.

Sir Maurice's daughter Caroline "Lina" (1874–1964) became an author and foreign correspondent for The Observer; she was the mother of author Gordon Waterfield and grandmother of the historian Sir Antony Beevor.

References

Works cited
 

1811 births
1872 deaths
Baronets in the Baronetage of the United Kingdom